The Luther Elliott House is a historic house in Reading, Massachusetts. The modestly sized 1.5-story wood-frame house was built in 1850 by Luther Elliott, a local cabinetmaker who developed an innovative method of sawing wood veneers. The house has numerous well preserved Greek Revival features, including corner pilasters, and a front door surrounded with sidelight windows and pilasters supporting a tall entablature.

The house was listed on the National Register of Historic Places in 1984.

See also
National Register of Historic Places listings in Middlesex County, Massachusetts
National Register of Historic Places listings in Reading, Massachusetts

References

Houses on the National Register of Historic Places in Reading, Massachusetts
Houses in Reading, Massachusetts
1850 establishments in Massachusetts
Houses completed in 1850